The 1984 Coupe de France Final was a football match held at Parc des Princes, Paris, on 11 May 1984 that saw FC Metz defeat AS Monaco FC 2–0 thanks to goals by Philippe Hinschberger and Tony Kurbos.

Match details

See also
1983–84 Coupe de France

External links
Coupe de France results at Rec.Sport.Soccer Statistics Foundation
Report on French federation site

Coupe
1984
Coupe De France Final 1984
Coupe De France Final 1984
Coupe De France Final
Coupe De France Final